Opened in 1991 at a cost of $5.3 million, the Atkins Tennis Center is home to both men and women's tennis at the University of Illinois at Urbana-Champaign. The tennis center features six indoor courts and twenty outdoor courts. Additionally, the complex has a pro shop and court times for general public use.  It also hosts  elite junior tournaments and one of the longest running professional tournaments on the USTA Pro Circuit: the JSM Challenger.  The facility includes the Khan Outdoor Tennis Complex.

2013
The 2013 NCAA Division I Women's and Men's Tennis Championships was hosted by the Atkins Tennis Center.  This was the first time since 2005 (when there was a combined men and women's championship) that a Midwest school hosted the NCAA Tournament.

References

College tennis venues in the United States
Illinois Fighting Illini men's tennis venues
Illinois Fighting Illini women's tennis venues
Tennis venues in Illinois
Sports venues in Champaign–Urbana, Illinois
Tourist attractions in Champaign County, Illinois
Buildings and structures of the University of Illinois Urbana-Champaign
Buildings and structures in Urbana, Illinois
Sports venues completed in 1991
1991 establishments in Illinois